The 1974 Copa Libertadores Finals was the final two-legged tie to determine the 1974 Copa Libertadores champion. It was contested by Argentine club Independiente and Brazilian club São Paulo. The first leg of the tie was played on October 12 at Pacaembú of São Paulo while the second leg was held in Estadio Doble Visera of Avellaneda, on October 16.

After both teams won one game each, a playoff was played at Estadio Nacional de Santiago on 19 October. Independiente crowned champion after beating Sao Paulo 1–0, achieving its 5th cup.

Qualified teams

Venues

Match details

First leg

Second leg

Playoff

References

1
Copa Libertadores Finals
Copa Libertadores Final 1974
Copa Libertadores Final 1973
Copa
Copa
Football in Avellaneda